The 2014–15 season is the club's second season in the Scottish Premiership and their ninth consecutive appearance in the top flight of Scottish football. St Mirren will also compete in the League Cup and the Scottish Cup.

Month by month review

May

On 12 May it was announced that Danny Lennon would not be offered a new contract by the club, bringing an end to his four-year reign as St Mirren manager.

On 13 May the club confirmed former first team coach Tommy Craig as new St Mirren manager. Club captain, Jim Goodwin, and Gary Teale were also appointed as player-coaches to assist Craig.

On 18 May the SPFL awarded Saints midfielder Kenny McLean with the Player of the Month award for April 2014. This was the first time a St Mirren player had received the award from the new governing body.

On 19 May it was announced that defender David van Zanten would not be offered a new contract, and will be leaving the club after making over 332 appearances and scoring 8 goals.

On 20 May it was confirmed that Steven Thompson has been appointed as the new St Mirren club captain for the upcoming season.

Also on this day it was confirmed that Eric Djemba-Djemba, Conor Newton, Josh Magennis and Adam Campbell had left the club.

On 27 May it was announced that midfielder Paul McGowan would not be offered a new contract, and had been released by the club.

Also on this day it was confirmed that Slovakian goalkeeper Marián Kello, and defender Mo Yaqub had signed new one-year deals with the club.

June

On 6 June the club announced Scottish goalkeeper Mark Ridgers as Tommy Craig's first signing for the club.

On 11 June defender Darren McGregor left the club on a free transfer, signing for Scottish Championship side Rangers.

On 12 June Tommy Craig confirmed that French goalkeeper, Christopher Dilo, had been released after he failed to respond to the offer of a new contract.

On 26 June it was announced that Saints had made their second signing on the summer, with English forward James Marwood joining on a one-year deal from Conference National side Gateshead.

On 27 June the club announced that midfielder, Gary Harkins, has had his contract with the club cancelled by mutual consent. After signing in the summer of 2013, Harkins had an unsuccessful time at the club and was loaned out to Oldham Athletic in January 2014.

July

On 2 July it was announced that midfielder Kenny McLean had signed a two-year contract extension with the club, tying him to the club until the summer of 2016.

Also on this day, the club confirmed that Manchester City defender Ellis Plummer had signed on a one-year loan deal.

On 14 July it was announced that 20-year-old striker Ross Caldwell had signed a one-year deal with the club, with the option of a further year. The former Hibernian player was released in the summer following their relegation from the Scottish Premiership, and signed for Saints after a successful trial.

On 19 July Saints won the Renfrewshire Cup when they defeated local rivals Greenock Morton 1–0 at Cappielow. This was the 55th time that Saints have lifted the trophy, and the eighth time they have defeated Greenock Morton in the last nine finals.

On 25 July, defender Jeroen Tesselaar returned to Saints on a one-year deal. The Dutch player left the club in 2012, but has returned after leaving Kilmarnock on a free transfer in the summer.

On 30 July Saints signed striker Callum Ball on a one-year deal, with the option of a further year. The Englishman impressed the club by scoring 5 goals in two pre-season friendly matches, while playing as a trialist.

August

On 6 August, Saints were drawn at home to Scottish League One side Dunfermline Athletic, for the 2nd Round of the Scottish League Cup. The tie will take place on 26 or 27 August.

On 19 August it was announced that midfielder Adam Drury had signed a season long loan deal with Saints, moving from Manchester City.

On 21 August it was announced that defensive midfielder Isaac Osbourne had signed a one-year deal with the club. Isaac has previously played in Scotland with Aberdeen, and most recently Partick Thistle

On 27 August, Saints were drawn away to Partick Thistle in the 3rd Round of the Scottish League Cup.

September

On 17 September, it was confirmed that striker Steven Thompson would undergo surgery for a groin injury. Thompson has been a vital part of the Saints squad since joining the club three years ago, and this is a massive blow for the season ahead. Thompson is expected to be out of action for around three months.

October

November

On 3 November Saints were handed a home tie against Inverness Caledonian Thistle in the 4th Round of the 2014–15 Scottish Cup, with the tie being played on 29 November 2014.

On 5 November Saints player-coach, Jim Goodwin, accepted a three–match ban following a charge of violent conduct. The club's board expressed their disappointment in the players conduct, following an elbowing incident on Aidan Connolly in the recent defeat at Dundee United.

On 18 November defender Jason Naismith earned his first Scotland Under–21 cap against Switzerland in a friendly match. The 20-year old came on as a 72nd-minute substitute, replacing Marcus Fraser. The match ended in a 1–1 draw.

December

On 9 December it was announced that manager Tommy Craig had left the club by mutual consent. It was not a surprise announcement, following recent pressure from the club's fans – due to the poor record of Craig since taking charge of the team. It was confirmed that Gary Teale will take interim charge of the first team until a new manager is appointed, with Head of Youth Development David Longwell assisting.

January

On 2 January the club confirmed that Ellis Plummer and youngster Declan Hughes had left the club. Plummer made 7 appearances for the club, but due to injuries his one-year loan period was cut short. Youth player Declan Hughes was freed without having played a match for the club.

On 5 January the club announced that Adam Drury had left the club, cutting short his one-year loan period from Manchester City.

On the same day the club also announced that it had rejected a bid from Fleetwood Town for young midfielder, Kenny McLean. The bid of approximately £150,000 was deemed to low, with the club stating "the offer does not come close to the club's valuation of the player".

On 9 January summer signing Ross Caldwell left the club by mutual consent, after failing to make an impact. In total he made 15 appearances, and scored 2 goals.

Also on this day, Stevie Mallan won the SPFL Young Player of the Month award for December 2014, following his impressive start to his senior Saints career.

On 14 January striker Yoann Arquin signed for the club until the end of season 2014–15.

On 20 January summer signing James Marwood left the club by mutual consent, having failed to make an impact on the first team.

On 24 January it was announced that teenager Stevie Mallan had signed a three-year contract extension, tying him to the club until the summer of 2018.

On 29 January the club confirmed Gary Teale as club manager, after almost two months serving as caretaker manager. Teale will take charge until the end of the season.

Also on this day, midfielder James Dayton joined the club on loan from Oldham Athletic until the end of the season.

February

On 2 February midfielder Kenny McLean was transferred to Aberdeen for a reported fee of £300,000.

Also on this day Saints signed 18-year-old attacking midfielder Emmanuel Sonupe on-loan from Tottenham Hotspur until the end of the season.

On 4 February it was announced that Republic of Ireland Under-21 attacking midfielder, Kieran Sadlier, had signed for Saints until the end of the season, after being released by West Ham United.

On 19 February manager Gary Teale was given a two-match touchline ban by the SFA for comments he previously made about referee Steven McLean.

On 20 February Saints signed Alan Gow until the end of season.

On 26 February Saints signed Bulgarian defender Viktor Genev until the end of season.

March

On 31 March Lewis McLear signed a three–year contract extension. The deal means that he will be contracted to the club until the summer of 2018.

April

On 15 April defender Marc McAusland left the club by mutual consent. The Saints fan made 187 appearances for the club, scoring 6 goals.

On 21 April two more players cancelled their contracts with the club by mutual consent, before the close of the season. Forward Callum Ball leaves the club after making 24 appearances in total, scoring twice. Midfielder Isaac Osbourne also left the club, making 18 appearances without scoring.

On 27 April it was reported that club captain Steven Thompson "speared" teammate John McGinn in a bizarre training ground prank gone wrong. The incident happened before the recent 2015–16 Scottish Championship victory at home to Kilmarnock, and will see McGinn sidelined for around three weeks.

May

On 4 May Stevie Mallan was awarded with the PFA Scotland 'Goal of the Season' award, for his strike against Dundee on 27 December 2014.

On 8 May Saints were relegated to the Scottish Championship. This was confirmed following Motherwell's 3–1 win over Kilmarnock, leaving Saints unable escape relegation with three league games remaining.

On 11 May the St Mirren board released a statement, advising that they are inviting applications for the managers job. This is despite Gary Teale still being the current club manager.

On 14 May the club announced that youngsters Jack Baird, Lewis Morgan and Barry Cuddihy had all signed contract extensions to their current deals. Baird and Morgan have signed two–year extensions, while Cuddihy signed a one–year extension with the option of another year after that.

On 16 May chairman Stewart Gilmour confirmed that the permanent St Mirren manager role will be resolved in 'the next 10 days'.

On 22 May the club announced that Dumbarton manager, Ian Murray, had been appointed as Saints new manager. Despite being officially announced today, current manager Gary Teale will remain in charge for the last league game of the season away to Hamilton Academical.

Results and fixtures

Pre season / Friendlies

Scottish Premiership

Scottish League Cup

Scottish Cup

Player statistics

Captains

Squad information
Last updated 23 May 2015

|-
|colspan="14"|Players who left club during the season:

|}

Disciplinary record
Includes all competitive matches.
Last updated 23 May 2015

Team statistics

League table

Division summary

Transfers

In

Out

See also
List of St Mirren F.C. seasons

References

St Mirren F.C. seasons
St Mirren